Below are the squads for the 1993 Bandy World Championship final tournament in Norway.

Group A

Finland

Norway

Russia

Sweden
Coach: Rolf Käck

References

Bandy World Championship squads